CCVS, or Credit Card Verification System, was a credit card processing system designed for Posix-based operating systems, including Unix, Linux, and a version for Palm OS shown at trade shows.  It was originally sold by Hell's Kitchen Systems, Inc. from 1997 onward and was acquired along with the company by Red Hat in January 2000.  In 2002, Red Hat decided to exit the eCommerce market as an ISV, discontinued support for CCVS, and recommended that customers transition to MCVE.

The CCVS API supported use under PHP, Java, Perl, Tcl, and C to allow merchants to communicate directly with the credit card clearing house instead of using Internet-based intermediaries. Along with Red Hat's decision to discontinue support for this extension, it has also been removed from PHP and is no longer available since version 4.3.0. An alternative to CCVS is MCVE.

External links
PHP Manual Entry on CCVS
PHP Manual Entry on MCVE
Red Hat Manual on CCVS
Main Street Softworks

Credit card terminology